Cosmopolite is an album by American jazz saxophonist Benny Carter recorded at three sessions between 1952 and 1954 and released by Norgran Records. The album features tracks that were released on the 10-inch LP The Urbane Mr. Carter.

Reception

Allmusic awarded the album 3 stars, stating that the album "showcases altoist Benny Carter in two very different settings. Side one finds him interpreting ballads in front of a string section while the flip side matches Carter with the Oscar Peterson Trio and drummer J.C. Heard. It is a credit to his versatility and talents that Benny Carter plays quite well in both formats."

Track listing

Tracks 1-6, 11-12 are included on the original The Urbane Mr. Carter 10" album.

Personnel 
 Benny Carter – alto saxophone, arranger
 Oscar Peterson – piano
 Barney Kessel – guitar
 Jack Marshall – guitar
 Ray Brown – double bass
 Red Callender – double bass
 J. C. Heard – drums
 Jackie Mills – drums
 Alvin Stoller – drums
 Hoyt Bohannon – trombone
 Joe Howard – trombone
 Tommy Pederson – trombone
 Juan Tizol – valve trombone

References 

1956 albums
Benny Carter albums
Norgran Records albums
Verve Records albums
Albums produced by Norman Granz